Strathspey may refer to one of the following:

 Strathspey, Scotland, an area in the Highlands of Scotland
 Strathspey Camanachd, a shinty team from Grantown-on-Spey
 Strathspey (dance), a type of dance tune in 4/4 time